Pampered Chef is a multinational multi-level marketing company that offers a line of kitchen tools, food products, and cookbooks for preparing food in the home. They also offer some products to help transport some of their products and gardening tools.

It has a worldwide direct sales force of about 35,000 in addition to 400 corporate staff. The company is headquartered in Addison, Illinois, and operates in five countries: the United States, Germany, Canada, Austria, and France.

History
Doris Christopher founded Pampered Chef in 1980 in the basement of her suburban Chicago home. Christopher came up with a party plan to offer professional-quality kitchen tools directly to consumers through in-home cooking demonstrations, a concept first popularized by Tupperware. The company expanded to Canada in 1996, the UK in 1999, Germany in 2000, Austria in 2019, and France in 2020.

The company was acquired in 2002 by Warren Buffett's Berkshire Hathaway corporation. On October 30, 2014, Berkshire Hathaway appointed long time advisor Tracy Britt Cool to the position of CEO. According to Direct Selling News, "the company’s revenue has fallen from $320 million in 2015 to $280 million in 2018." In March 2020, the company's COO, Andrew Treanor, took over on the role of CEO.

The company closed its UK business, and wound down UK operations as of December 31, 2015.

Products 

In 1990, Pampered Chef released a product known as the Valtrompia bread tube. The product is a metal tube in which refrigerated bread dough can be baked into a narrow, scalloped-edge loaf. As of the late 1990s, the product is available in five shapes—flower, square, heart, scalloped, and star. The bread is baked with the tube placed upright in the oven, allowing the bread to rise vertically along the tube.

References

Berkshire Hathaway
Multi-level marketing companies
Marketing companies established in 1980
Companies based in DuPage County, Illinois
Kitchenware brands
1980 establishments in Illinois
2002 mergers and acquisitions
American corporate subsidiaries